Christian Gottlieb Schick (15 August 1776 – 7 May 1812) was a German Neoclassical painter. His history paintings, portraits, and landscapes are characterized by romantic tendencies. Of these, he is best known for his portraits.

Life and work
He was born in Stuttgart. He studied from 1795 to 1797 at the Hohe Karlsschule under Philipp Friedrich von Hetsch, a follower of Jacques-Louis David. In 1797–98 he studied under Johann Heinrich von Dannecker, after which he relocated to Paris where he spent 1799 to 1802 in David's studios.

Between 1802 and 1811 he stayed in Rome, where he became an important figure in that city's artistic and intellectual circles. He was an especially good friend of Wilhelm von Humboldt and his family. In Schick's last years, his style of Raphaelesque classicism gradually acquired a romantic orientation. In 1809, he was presented with a special citation by a group of French and Italian artists.

He returned to Stuttgart in 1811, but died there only a few months later, of heart disease.

References

Further reading 
 
 Simon, Karl: "Ph. Fr. Hetsch u. Gottlieb Schick in ihren persönl. Beziehungen." in: Württ. Vierteljahresschr. f. Landesgeschichte, ed. 20–21, 1911, p. 161 ff.
 Von Holst, Christian (Ed.): Schwäbischer Klassizismus zwischen Ideal und Wirklichkeit 1770-1830. Stuttgart, 1993. 
 Gottlieb Schick. Ein Maler des Klassizismus. Ed. Ulrike Gauß & Christian von Holst. (Exhibit Catalog). Staatsgalerie Stuttgart, Stuttgart, 1976.
 Bernardini, Ingrid Sattel. "Schick, Gottlieb". In Grove Art Online. Oxford Art Online, (accessed 30 December 2011; subscription required).

External links 

 Entry for Gottlieb Schick in the Union List of Artist Names

1776 births
1812 deaths
Artists from Stuttgart
German neoclassical painters
19th-century painters of historical subjects
People educated at the Karlsschule Stuttgart